Jasień  is a village in the administrative district of Gmina Staszów, within Staszów County, Świętokrzyskie Voivodeship, in south-central Poland.

The village has a population of  154.

Demography 
According to the 2002 Poland census, there were 161 people residing in Jasień village, of whom 49.1% were male and 50.9% were female. In the village, the population was spread out, with 23% under the age of 18, 30.4% from 18 to 44, 21.7% from 45 to 64, and 24.8% who were 65 years of age or older.
 Figure 1. Population pyramid of village in 2002 — by age group and sex

References

Villages in Staszów County